The Helicopter unit (Macedonian: Хеликоптерска единица) is an air support unit of the Macedonian Ministry of Internal Affairs. Its purpose it to provide aerial surveillance, border monitoring, VIP transport, medevac, search and rescue, and aerial firefighting.

Helicopters

Current

Former
Bell 206A
MI-17B

See also
 Police of North Macedonia

References

Government agencies of North Macedonia